The National Red Cross Pageant (1917) was an American war pageant that was performed in order to sell war bonds, support the National Red Cross, and promote a positive opinion about American involvement in World War I.  It was also an all-star revue silent film, now considered a lost film, directed by Christy Cabanne.

Production background
On October 5, 1917, a live open-air pageant was held at the Rosemary Open Air Amphitheater on a private estate, Rosemary Farm, near Huntington, New York. It was also performed again a few weeks later at the Metropolitan Opera in New York City. Both performances drew large crowds whose numbers were in the hundreds, and consisted mostly of wealthy New Yorkers. The event was mainly the brainchild of Ben Ali Haggin, famous as a stage designer. His wife appears in one of the episodes. The earnings from the live pageant itself went to the Red Cross.

Presumably the filming of the pageant was made with a patriotic fervor in the wake of the United States entry into World War I in April 1917. The proceeds from the film going to the war effort, such as the Red Cross, War Bonds, etc.

A litany of famous Broadway and motion picture stars of the period participated in the production. Lionel, Ethel, and John Barrymore all appeared in the production but not together in the same scenes as they did in Rasputin and the Empress (1932). According to the National Red Cross Bulletin, 500 people appeared in the production and more than 5,000 spectators were in attendance.

The proceeds from the pageant were reported as having been in the amount of $50,000 which created a way for American citizens to make a difference for their country's participation in the Great War, and it also allowed these same citizens to feel a sense of national pride for their beloved homeland.

Its success was so remarkable, the National Red Cross later proclaimed December 7 National Red Cross Theatrical Day.

Synopsis

The pageant consisted of episodes from the history of each of the Allies.  The case of each Ally before the bar of Truth, Justice, and Liberty, was organized by actors and actresses of the American stage.  Decorators and artists collaborated in the settings and costuming.  The first of two parts consisted of historic episodes in relation to the Allied nations. The prologue, spoken by Edith Wynne Matthison, dedicated an altar to Peace and was followed by rhythmic dancing by Florence Fleming Noyes and her pupils. A scene from early Flemish days followed, and four famous cities, Bruges, Ghent, Ypres, and Louvain paid their allegiance to Flanders, played by Ethel Barrymore in the costume seen in Flemish paintings.  The Italian scene followed and then the scene of the birth of English liberty, as represented by King John signing the Magna Carta.  Medieval Russia was played by John Barrymore as a tyrant borne upon the shoulders of his serfs.  In the French episode, Ina Claire appeared as Jeanne D'Arc riding her white charger.

In "The Drawing of the Sword", the second half of the pageant, each nation among the Allies appeared to present its case before the court of Truth, Justice, and Liberty. Serbia entered first and told her story of the opening of the war, to which Truth spoke assent. Belgium followed, and to her aid came England and France, while Russia came to the support of her ally, Serbia. Next, England called upon her overseas colonies, and Japan also, brought her pledge to maintain the cause of liberty on the Pacific. Armenia came to tell her wrongs; and Italy, shaking off the bonds of the Triple Alliance, cast her lot with the defenders of liberty. The grand climax was reached with the entry of America in the person of Marjorie Rambeau.

Jenna Kubly said the pageant described the United States' position in the war as "a nation involved in a just war to free all nations."

The Red Cross Bulletin wrote:

Many of the leading theatrical stars of America contributed their services in The National Red Cross Pageant held on the afternoon of October 5 at the Rosemary Open-Air Theater, on the estate of Roland B. Conklin, Huntington, L.I. Five hundred persons appeared in the production, which was in two parts. The first was made up of festival scenes illustrating the spirit of the allied nations. The second, a dramatic statement of the Allies' cause in the war, was entitled "The Drawing of the Sword".

Critics reported the pageant one of the most elaborate and artistic dramatic events ever staged out of doors. Weather conditions were ideal. More than 5,000 people were in the audience.

Costume and scenic elements
The Rosemary Open-Air Amphitheater is an outdoor playing space that includes a stage area for the actors that is separated from the audience by a small moat. The audience space includes raked seating incorporated in the terrain. Behind the stage there are trees and flora that make up the background. The set of The National Red Cross Pageant included a large throne and an archway made of stone. There were many different costumes in The National Red Cross Pageant due to the great variety of roles including soldiers, mermaids, and personified countries.

Cast
Edith Wynne Matthison - Prologue
Douglas Wood - Herald, Flemish episode
Ethel Barrymore - Flanders, Belgium; Flemish and Final episodes
Kitty Gordon - Bruges; Flemish episode
Margaret Moreland - Ghent; Flemish episode
Adelaide Prince - Ypres; Flemish episode
Olive Tell - Louvain; Flemish episode
Irene Fenwick - Herald; Italian episode
Montgomery Irving - The Alps; Italian episode
Annette Kellerman - The Mediterranean; Italian episode
Josephine Drake - The Adriatic; Italian episode
Ethel McDonough - Leader of the Lakes; Italian episode
Norman Trevor - Herald; English episode
George Backus - King John; English episode
Marjorie Wood - Queen; English episode
Maclyn Arbuckle - Baron Fitz-Walter; English episode (billed as Macklyn Arbuckle)
Lumsden Hare - The Archbishop of Canterbury; English episode

Frank Keenan - The Secretary; English episode
Frederick Truesdell - The Papal Legate; English episode
Mrs. Ben Ali Haggin - Dance, The Pavane; French episode
Clifton Webb - Dancer, The Pavane; French episode
Ben Ali Haggin - Dunois, Defender of France; French episode
Ina Claire - Jeanne D'Arc; French episode
Guy Favières - Charles VII, the Dauphin; French episode
John Barrymore - The Tyrant; Russian episode
George F. Smithfield - The Fugitive; Russian episode
Alice Fischer - Herald; Final episode
Howard Kyle - Justice; Final episode
Blanche Yurka - Truth; Final episode
Gladys Hanson - Liberty; Final episode
Tyrone Power, Sr. - Servia; Final episode (billed as Tyrone Power)
E. H. Sothern - England; Final episode
Rita Jolivet - France; Final episode
Richard Bennett - Final episode
Michio Itō - Japan; Final episode
Marjorie Rambeau - America; Final episode
Lionel Barrymore
Mrs. H. P. Davison
Hazel Dawn
William T. Rock
Helen Ware
Frances White

See also
List of lost films
The Common Cause (1919)
Ethel Barrymore on stage, screen and radio

References

Kubly, Jenna L. "Staging the Great War in the National Red Cross Pageant." The Journal of 	American Drama and Theatre, 2012. ProQuest Research Library [ProQuest].
Stevens, Thomas Wood. The Drawing of the Sword: Together with the Text of the National Red 	Cross Pageant. C.C. Birchard, 1917.

External links

National Red Cross Pageant at SilentEra
National Red Cross Pageant preparations from oldlongisland.com
Rosemary Farm & The National Red Cross Pageant; oldlongisland.com

1917 films
American silent feature films
Films directed by Christy Cabanne
Lost American films
American Red Cross
American black-and-white films
1917 lost films
1910s American films